Monocentropus is a genus of tarantulas that was first described by Reginald Innes Pocock in 1897.  it contains three species, found on Madagascar and in Yemen: M. balfouri, M. lambertoni, and M. longimanus.

M. balfouri has many unusual characteristics for a tarantula species, most notably their heightened aggression towards humans, gregarious nature with others of their own kind, and strong maternal instincts, with mothers even bringing food to their spiderlings. Their striking blue coloration and tendency to live in colonies make them an attractive, rewarding but challenging and obstreperous-natured pet.

See also
 List of Theraphosidae species

References

Theraphosidae genera
Spiders of Africa
Spiders of Asia
Taxa named by R. I. Pocock
Theraphosidae